Richard Hart (born 30 March 1978) is a Scottish former footballer who played as a midfielder for Brora Rangers.

Career
Born in Inverness, he began his career with Ross County in 1996. Having spent three years there, Hart spent another three with Brora Rangers, before joining Inverness Caledonian Thistle in 2002.

He played for his home town club for six years and represented them in the Scottish Premier League, before returning to Ross County for a season.

Hart joined Dundee in 2009, and played for them for one season before moving to Maltese Premier League side Hibernians.

After leaving Malta, Hart joined Saudi Arabian side Ettifaq FC.

Hart rejoined Brora Rangers on a two-year deal in June 2012. In 2014 Hart was injured and did not return to play for Brora Rangers.

Honours
Dundee
Scottish Challenge Cup: 2009–10

References

External links

Living people
1978 births
Footballers from Inverness
Scottish footballers
Association football midfielders
Ross County F.C. players
Inverness Caledonian Thistle F.C. players
Dundee F.C. players
Hibernians F.C. players
Scottish Football League players
Scottish Premier League players
Scottish expatriate footballers
Expatriate footballers in Malta
Brora Rangers F.C. players
Ettifaq FC players
Highland Football League players